The flag of Newfoundland and Labrador was introduced in 1980 and was designed by Newfoundland artist Christopher Pratt. The flag design was approved by the House of Assembly of the province of Newfoundland, Canada, on May 28, 1980. It was flown for the first time on Discovery Day, June 24, 1980. The name of the province was changed to Newfoundland and Labrador by an amendment to the constitution of Canada in December 2001 at the request of the provincial legislature.

Design

Symbolism
The design was chosen due to its broad symbolism. The blue (pantone 2955C) represents the waters of the sea, lakes and rivers; the white represents snow and ice; the red (pantone 200C) represents human effort, and the yellow gold (pantone 137C) symbolizes the confidence the people of Newfoundland and Labrador have in themselves and for the future.

The flag design is that of etchings on Beothuk and Innu decorative pendants worn hung from a cord around the neck. Pratt viewed these at the Provincial Museum. With the blue, red and white colours applied, the design has an intentional overall resemblance to the Union Jack, as a reminder of historic connections with the British Isles. The two red (pantone 200C) triangles represent the two areas of the province, Labrador the continental region and Newfoundland the insular region. The gold (pantone 137C) arrow, according to Pratt, points towards a "brighter future"; the arrow becomes a sword, honouring the sacrifices of Newfoundlanders and Labradorians in military service when the flag is displayed as a vertical banner. The red triangles and the gold arrow form a trident, symbolizing the province's association with the fisheries and other resources of and under the sea.

Construction Sheet

Newfoundland ensigns

The Red Ensign was officially endorsed by King Charles II in 1674; this authorisation recognised it as the ensign of English merchant shipping.  Later, during the Victorian era, the flag—with colonial badge—formed the basis as the Colony of Newfoundland's civil ensign. Old oil paintings show red ensigns flying from the topmasts of Grand Banks schooners. While 19th century photographs show red ensigns flown at Moravian mission stations and Hudson's Bay Company trading posts along the Labrador Coast.

In 1904, the British Parliament designated a civil ensign specifically for Newfoundland. The Red and Blue Ensigns with the Great Seal of Newfoundland in the fly were the colony's (later dominion)'s official flags from 1904 until 1931, after which the Union Jack was adopted as Newfoundland's official national flag and the ensigns reserved for shipping and marine identification—the Red Ensign to be flown by merchant shipping while the blue was flown by governmental ships.  Neither ensign was immediately formally adopted by the Newfoundland National Assembly, which sat at the Colonial Building in St. John's, when Newfoundland became an independent Dominion of the British Empire in 1907.  It was not until the Newfoundland National Flag Act of 1931 that the Newfoundland parliament officially adopted the Union Jack as the national flag of Newfoundland and re-affirmed the red and blue ensigns as official flags for marine identification.  Between 1907 and 1931, however, the red ensign gained wide enough use, both at sea and on land by civilians and government alike, that it was considered to be the national flag.

The badge in the ensigns consists of Mercury, the god of commerce and merchandise, presenting to Britannia a fisherman who, in a kneeling attitude, is offering the harvest of all the sea. Above the device in a scroll are the Latin words 'Terra Nova', and below the motto Hæc Tibi Dona Fero or "These gifts I bring thee." The seal was redesigned by Adelaine Lane, niece of Governor Sir Cavendish Boyle.

Union Flag

The old flag of Newfoundland was the Union Flag. It was legally adopted in 1931 and used as Newfoundland's national flag until confederation with Canada in 1949. It was then readopted as the official provincial flag in 1952 and used officially until 1980. The Newfoundland and Labrador branches of the Royal Canadian Legion to this day display the Union Flag along with the current Newfoundland and Labrador provincial and national (Canada maple leaf) flags.

Newfoundland Tricolour

The flag which has become known as the "Newfoundland Tricolour", the "Pink, White and Green" (sic) began as the unofficial flag of an aid and benefit organization, the Newfoundland Fishermen's Star of the Sea Association, which was established in St. John's in 1871 by the Catholic Church. The official banner of the association was a green background with a white star and a pink cross in it. These colours gave rise to the green (at the hoist) white (in the centre) and pink (on the fly) tricolour flag which was more easily manufactured than the official banner. The flag has the proportions 1:2 with each vertical section occupying one-third of the flag length.

It exists in Canadian heraldry; its colours are present in the flag of the St. John's Fire Department and in the municipal flag of Paradise, Newfoundland and Labrador. It also appears on the crests or escutcheons of some armorial bearings portrayed in the Public Register of Arms, Flags and Badges of Canada. The first but unofficial flag of the Colony of Newfoundland (Island and Labrador) was the Red (at the hoist), White (centre) and Green (on the fly) tricolour of the Newfoundland Natives' Society (NNS) which was established in St. John's in 1840 with subsequent branches in other locations. The Newfoundland Natives' Society was established to help native-born and other long-time residents of Newfoundland in dealings with colonial government officials, big business owners who were not always residents and the many newcomers to the colony who considered themselves to be much higher in social standing than the locals even though the vast majority of locals were of the same British Isles ancestry as the new arrivals. The red-white-green tricolour served as the unofficial national flag of Newfoundland from the mid to late 1800s. It fell into disuse after the Society stopped functioning in 1866. Responsible Government was established in 1855 and with it the need for the NNS waned. The NNS had campaigned for the introduction of Responsible Government.

Origins
The origins of the "Pink, White and Green" were obscure but recent scholarship has determined it was first used in the late 1870s or early 1880s by an aid and benefit organization, the Newfoundland Fishermen's the Star of the Sea Association, which was established by the Roman Catholic Church in 1871. Polaris (the north star) was extremely important in navigation and is known as the Star of the Sea. Also in the Catholic Church, Mary, the mother of Jesus, is known as the "Star of the Sea" (in Latin "Stella Maris"). The flag became more widely used shortly thereafter, by other Catholic groups in St. John's and the surrounding area. Given that, it was likely based on the similar flag of Ireland (then also unofficial). It is also said that the current Republic of Ireland flag is actually based on the "Pink, White and Green" tricolour but the Irish tricolour was in use long before 1871. Newspaper reports indicate a "native flag" was displayed in public ceremonies alongside the Union Jack when the Prince of Wales visited St. John's in 1860, but that was the Native Flag of "Red, White and Green" rather than the "Pink, White and Green" (sic) since the Star of the Sea Association did not exist until 1871.

The green-white-pink tricolour flag was dismissed as a potential official flag when the British Parliament legislated a civil ensign for Newfoundland in 1904, which was a Red Ensign defaced with the Great Seal of Newfoundland. The great seal was used rather than the shield from the coat of arms since the coat of arms had been forgotten and its use was only reinstated after the First World War for use on war graves in Europe. The coat of arms has been in use since.

During the provincial flag debates of the 1970s an edition of the Roman Catholic archdiocese's newsletter "The Monitor" revived the idea that the flag is symbolic of a tradition between local ethnically-English Protestants (represented by the pink) and ethnically-Irish Catholics (represented by the green). The vert was said to represent the flag of Brian Boru, the rose symbolized the Rose of England and the argent represented the peace between them, and the Cross of Saint Andrew. The claim that pink was representative of English Newfoundlanders was first made by R.C.Bishop Michael F Howley in his 1902 poem "The Flag of Newfoundland". While the colour pink or rose is not directly representative of England or English Newfoundlanders it can evoke an image of a rose which is the floral emblem of England, although it is not a pink rose but the red and white Tudor rose. The Newfoundland Natives' Society, which was claimed in the legend as being a Protestant society which used a pink flag, actually contained Catholics as well as Protestants, including a Catholic president (Dr Edward Kielly) at the supposed time of the inception of the "Pink, White and Green". Pink (rose) has never been used in any known fashion to represent England, its people or any of the Protestant denominations.

In another version of the legend, originating around 1900, it was claimed that the green represented newly arriving Irish settlers to Newfoundland and pink was again taken from the Natives' Society flag, but this time the Natives' Society was said to be a Roman Catholic group representing Catholics already living in Newfoundland. Protestants were not included at all. The latest interpretation of the supposed symbolism of the "Pink, White and Green" seems to have arisen in the 1970s during provincial flag debates in Newfoundland as an effort to gain Protestant support for an Irish-based flag - Protestants representing 60% of the province's population - but it is unlikely to be a factual account of history. The flag gained a sentimental resurgence in the 1990s/2000s both as a political statement and on products aimed at the tourism industry.

Flag of the Federation des Francophones de Terre-Neuve et du Labrador

The flag of the Fédération des Francophones de Terre-Neuve et du Labrador is based on the French tricolour and Acadian flag, with three unequal panels of blue, white, and red. Two yellow sails are set on the line between the white and red panels. The sail on top is charged with a black spruce twig as seen on the Labrador flag. The black (bog) spruce is Newfoundland and Labrador's official provincial tree. The bottom sail is charged with a pitcher plant, the official provincial flower of Newfoundland and Labrador. These emblems are outlined in black.

The sails represent early Basque, Breton, and French fishermen that came to the area in the early 1500s. At the same time, they are symbols of action and progress. The yellow is taken from the star of the Acadian flag. The black spruce and pitcher plant are official symbols of Newfoundland and Labrador. The black spruce twig on the flag of the Federation des Francophones de Terre-Neuve et du Labrador is an emblem of Labrador and is also found on the Labrador flag. The flag's colours of red, white, blue and yellow are also found in the provincial flag of Newfoundland and Labrador.

Labrador flag

The Labrador Flag was created by a small group led by Member of the House of Assembly for Labrador South Mike Martin in 1974. Martin et al did so as an act of political mischief aimed at Premier Joey Smallwood and his Liberal government's perceived indifference to Labrador and the provincial government's refusal to use anything other than the Union Jack as the provincial flag. The Labrador flag gave, at least, that part of the province its own  distinctive flag. As Martin is from Cartwright, the town now proclaims itself the "Birthplace of the Labrador Flag". The flag was presented to Labrador community councils, and to the Labrador members of the House of Assembly, in April 1974 and is six years older than provincial flag of Newfoundland and Labrador which was introduced in 1980 by the Progressive Conservative government of Premier Brian Peckford.

Nunatsiavut flag

The self-governing Inuit region of Nunatsiavut has its own flag: The flag of Nunatsiavut is the flag adopted by the Labrador Inuit Association to represent the Inuit of Labrador and their new Land Claims Settlement Area called Nunatsiavut. The flag features the traditional Inuit Inukshuk coloured white, blue, and green echoing the flag of Labrador.

See also

Symbols of Newfoundland and Labrador
Coat of arms of Newfoundland and Labrador

References

External links

Some Personal Observations And Some Historical Facts About The Labrador Flag (Carl S. Gurtman, 1996, New England Journal of Vexillology)
 Arms and flag of Newfoundland and Labrador in the online Public Register of Arms, Flags and Badges

Newfoundland and Labrador
Provincial symbols of Newfoundland and Labrador
Newfoundland And Labrador